Maria Iovleva (born 18 February 1990) is a Russian biathlete and cross-country skier representing Russia at the 2010 Winter Paralympics. 

She won two medals in sitting biathlon, one of them gold and was on the gold medal team of women's cross-country relay. She is deaf and paralyzed. She lives in a home with twelve other disabled women, but she dreams of getting an apartment of her own due to her medal wins.

References 

Paralympic gold medalists for Russia
Paralympic biathletes of Russia
Paralympic cross-country skiers of Russia
Biathletes at the 2010 Winter Paralympics
Cross-country skiers at the 2010 Winter Paralympics
Cross-country skiers at the 2014 Winter Paralympics
1990 births
Living people
Biathletes at the 2014 Winter Paralympics
Medalists at the 2010 Winter Paralympics
Deaf skiers
Russian female biathletes
Russian deaf people
Cross-country skiers at the 2018 Winter Paralympics
Paralympic medalists in cross-country skiing
Paralympic medalists in biathlon